King's Highway 141, commonly referred to as Highway 141, is a provincially maintained highway in the Canadian province of Ontario. Its western terminus is at Highway 400 south of Horseshoe Lake in Seguin Township while its eastern terminus is at Highway 11 near Port Sydney. The route was designated in 1974 when Highway 532 was renumbered and upgraded from a secondary highway to a King's Highway. The route has remained generally unchanged since, though it was extended by several kilometres on October 7, 2003 when Highway 400 was extended north of Mactier.

Route description 

Highway 141 is 54.3 km long. It travels through Muskoka District and Parry Sound District, travelling through the communities of Humphrey, Rosseau, Bent River (off-route but nearby), Ullswater, Raymond and Utterson. The road passes several bodies of water including Lake Rosseau, Skeleton Lake, Longs Lake and others. Other lakes are accessible via Highway 141 including Three Mile Lake, Lake Joseph, Horse Lake and others.

Highway 141 is the first major highway connection between Highway 400 and Highway 11 north of Barrie and the Muskoka Lakes Region. The highway terminates at Exit 207 on both of these highways, and is the only highway in Ontario to begin and end at the same exit number. On Highway 400, the Highway 141 junction is located near the Parry Sound Area Municipal Airport. Rosseau is the largest community located directly on the route.

History 
While Highway 141 was not designated until the mid-1970s, the route it follows was assumed in early 1956 by the Department of Highways. At that time, the route existed as Highway 532 and Highway 516. These two routes met southeast of Raymond, at what is now the junction with Muskoka District Road 35.
On January 1, 1973, the route of Highway 532 was modified so that it continued east along the former Highway 516 instead of curving south through Bracebridge.
This routing was short-lived; in 1974 the Ministry of Transportation and Communications redesignated the entirety of Highway 532 as Highway 141.

On October 7, 2003, with the extension of Highway 400 between Mactier and Horseshoe Lake, the western terminus of Highway 141 was shifted from Highway 69 at Hayes Corners southwest to Highway 400, adding three kilometres of shared routing with Highway 69 and the access road to the Parry Sound Airport. In the summer of 2012, Highway 69 was decommissioned in the area; the old route is now known as Rankin Lake Road north of the shared segment and Lake Joseph Road south of it.

Major intersections

References

External links 
Google Maps: Highway 141 route
Highway 141 pictures and information

141
Roads in Parry Sound District
Transport in Huntsville, Ontario